Gotalovec is a village in northern Croatia, located near Budinšćina in the region of Hrvatsko Zagorje. The population is 187 (census 2001).

History

Gotalovec, which means founded by Gotal, was established by the noble Gotal family in the thirteenth century. It primarily consisted of the medieval fort of Gotalovec (dated 1322), and the surrounding villages. It was in the possession of the Gotal family until 1740 when it was transferred by inheritance to the Somogy and later on the Bedekovic Komorski family. Finally, in the late 18th century it was incorporated by the noble Erdody family into their estate. In the nearby locality of Gotalovec, no trace of the former fort or later castle can presently be found as the remains of the latter were used as building material during construction of a nearby road. It is known however that the fort was situated some 100 to 200 cmeters from one of the source of the river Krapina; in 1988, one could clearly distinguish three levels under an orchard and an access through a hole in a bush which was no more accessible in 2002. Old people sead it gave access to a large room (some sort of wardroom) they visited as children. The 1500 castle was located westward from the fort. 

Modern Gotalovec is a peaceful and quite village. Nowadays it is famous for the spring of Bistra water which is located nearby Gotalovec in the foothills of the Ivanscica hill.

Gotalovec is inhabited by friendly and hospitable people. It is well known for its distinguished Hladika family. The Hladikas of Gotalovec are hosts of the annual party taking place in late August every year when family, friends and people from nearby localities seize the opportunity to relax over a cup of home-made 'Viljamovka' (alcoholic drink made of Williams pears), a glass of good wine and barbecue. The Hladika family is also an up-and-coming manufacturer of this drink.

Gotalovec is also known for its natural beauties, its swimming pools and mild climate.

References

Populated places in Krapina-Zagorje County